Renée Pilar Estevez (born April 2, 1967) is a former American actress and screenwriter.

Early years
Estevez was born in New York City, the youngest child and only daughter of artist Janet (née Templeton) and actor Martin Sheen (legally Ramón Estévez). Her father is of Irish and Spanish descent. Her three older brothers are also actors: Emilio Estevez, Ramon Estevez and Charlie Sheen (born Carlos Estévez).

Career
Estevez started her acting career in 1986 starring in a CBS Schoolbreak special, Babies Having Babies. Estevez has had secondary roles in films since 1986's Shattered Spirits, including the character Betty Finn in the cult favorite Heathers, and has guest starred on JAG and MacGyver. She appeared in a regular guest-starring role on The West Wing as Nancy, an office assistant in the Oval Office of President Josiah Bartlet (who is played by her father Martin Sheen). She has also had cameo roles in her brothers' and father's films. She also wrote for the TV series Anger Management which starred her brother Charlie Sheen. Estevez has not acted since 2015.

Personal life
Estevez married Jason Thomas Federico, a professional golfer and chef in New York. They met at the California Culinary Academy, where he received a degree in culinary arts and she studied pastry and baking science. They married on October 11, 1997, in a Catholic wedding at the Church of Our Lady of the Scapular–St. Stephen in New York. They were divorced in 2011 in Los Angeles.

Filmography

Film

Lethal Weapon (1987) – Underage Hooker (uncredited) (director's cut)
For Keeps? (1988) – Marnie
Sleepaway Camp II: Unhappy Campers (1988) – Molly
Forbidden Sun (1988) – Elaine
Heathers (1988) – Betty Finn
Intruder (1989) – Linda
Moon 44 (1990) – Executive (uncredited)
Marked for Murder (1990) – Justine
Single White Female (1992) – Perfect Applicant
Paper Hearts (1993) – Kat
Deadfall (1993, featured) – Baby's Babe
Good Girls Don't (1993) – Jeannie
Endangered (1994) – Andie
Running Wild (1995) – Aimee
The War at Home (1996) – Brenda
Entertaining Angels: The Dorothy Day Story (1996) – Lilly Batterham
Shadow Conspiracy (1997) – (cameo)
Loose Women (1997) – Make-up Lady (cameo)
Scar City (1998) – Cop #2 (cameo)
No Code of Conduct (1998) – Investigating Officer (uncredited) (cameo)
A Murder of Crows (1998) – Reporter #2 (cameo)
Storm (1999) – Andrea McIntyre
A Stranger in the Kingdom (1999) – Julia Hefner
Good Advice (2001) – Flight Attendant (cameo)
Out of These Rooms (2002) – Renee
Going Down (2003) – Cathy
Milost mora (2003) – Ana Lukovic
Astrothrill (2005, Video short) – Sandy and Gale
The Way (2010) – Doreen
The Kustomonsters Movie (2015) – Gale

TV Series
Shattered Spirits (1986, TV Movie) – Girl at Phone (cameo appearance)
CBS Schoolbreak Special (1986) – Max
Growing Pains (1987) – Robin
Hallmark Hall of Fame (episode 36: "The Room Upstairs") (1987) – Susan
MacGyver (1987) – Kelly Henderson
ABC Afterschool Special (1990) – Becky
Dead Silence (1991, TV Movie) – Zanna Young
Guilty Until Proven Innocent (1991, TV Movie) – Carol McLaughlin
Red Shoe Diaries (1992) – Private Chavez
Touch and Die (1992, TV Movie) – Emma
A Matter of Justice (1993, TV Movie) – Carole
Addams Family Reunion (1998, TV Movie) – Blonde Sharon
The West Wing (1999–2006) – Nancy
JAG (2000–2001) – Lieutenant Crandall / P.O. Daniels
The Division (2002) – Shelby's Work Colleague #1

Theater
Macbeth
Murderers Anonymous

References

External links

Interview at the Flesh Farm

1967 births
20th-century American actresses
21st-century American actresses
Actresses from California
Actresses from New York City
American film actresses
California Culinary Academy alumni
American stage actresses
American television actresses
American people of Galician descent
American people of Irish descent
Estevez family
Hispanic and Latino American actresses
Living people
Actresses from Malibu, California
People from St. George, Staten Island
Catholics from New York (state)
Catholics from California